Tom Randles may refer to:

 Tommy Randles (born 1940), former footballer for New Zealand 
 Tom Randles (hurler), Irish hurler